Krynicki is a surname. Notable people with the surname include:

 Nikifor, also known as Nikifor Krynicki (1895-1968), Lemko naïve painter
 Ryszard Krynicki (1943), Polish poet

See also 
 Krynicki (Sas and Korab), the surname of three Polish noble families